Kowone is a village located in Lim-Pendé Prefecture, Central African Republic.

History 
By 2021, Kowone was controlled by 3R rebels, who established a base there. On 3 October 2021, a mine explosion took place in Kowone and caused five casualties. 

On 16 January 2023, 3R rebels attacked Kowone. They looted shops and abducted two people; one of them was a merchant. Three days later, 3R released the merchant after he paid the ransom of 11 million CFA francs.

Facilities 
Kowone has one health post and a school.

References 

Populated places in Lim-Pendé